The 1979 New Zealand rugby union tour of England, Scotland and Italy was a series of eleven matches played by the New Zealand national rugby union team (the All Blacks) in England, Scotland and Italy in October and November 1979. The tour was very successful as the team won ten of the eleven games, including the international matches against Scotland and England. The only team to defeat the All Blacks was the English Northern Division.

Matches
Scores and results list New Zealand's points tally first.

Test matches

Scotland

SCOTLAND: Andy Irvine, Keith Robertson, Jim Renwick, David Johnston, Bruce Hay, John Rutherford, Alan Lawson, Iain Milne, Colin Deans, Ian McLauchlan (c), Alan Tomes, David Gray, Gordon Dickson, Ian Lambie, Mike Biggar

NEW ZEALAND: Richard Wilson, Stu Wilson, Gary Cunningham, Murray Taylor, Bernie Fraser, Eddie Dunn, Dave Loveridge, Brad Johnstone, Andy Dalton, John Spiers, Andy Haden, John Fleming, Ken Stewart, Murray Mexted, Graham Mourie (c).

England

ENGLAND: Dusty Hare, John Carleton, Tony Bond, Nick Preston, Mike Slemen, Les Cusworth, Steve Smith, Fran Cotton, Peter Wheeler, Colin Smart, Bill Beaumont (c), Maurice Colclough, Tony Neary, John Scott, Mike Rafter

NEW ZEALAND: Richard Wilson, Brian Ford, Stu Wilson, Gary Cunningham, Bernie Fraser, Murray Taylor, Dave Loveridge, Brad Johnstone, Peter Sloane, John Spiers, Andy Haden, John Fleming, Ken Stewart, Murray Mexted, Graham Mourie (c).

Touring party

Manager: Russell Thomas
Assistant Manager: Eric Watson
Captain: Graham Mourie
Physiotherapist: Brian McKenzie

Full back
Richard Wilson (Canterbury)
Allan Hewson (Wellington)

Three-quarters
Stu Wilson (Wellington)
Brian Ford (Marlborough)
Bernie Fraser (Wellington)
Gary Cunningham (Auckland)
Tim Twigden (Auckland)
Kieran Keane (Canterbury)

Half-backs
Eddie Dunn (North Auckland)
Murray Taylor (Waikato)
Mark Donaldson (Manawatu)
Dave Loveridge (Taranaki)

Forwards
Murray Mexted (Wellington)
Graham Mourie (Taranaki)
Ken Stewart (Southland)
Mike Burgoyne (North Auckland)
Vance Stewart (Canterbury)
Andy Haden (Auckland)
John Fleming (Wellington)
Brad Johnstone (Auckland)
Rod Ketels (Counties)
Barry Thompson (Canterbury)
John Spiers (Counties)
Andy Dalton (Counties)
Peter Sloane (North Auckland)

References

1979 rugby union tours
1979
1979
1979
1979
1979 in New Zealand rugby union
1979–80 in English rugby union
1979–80 in Italian rugby union
1979–80 in Scottish rugby union
1979–80 in European rugby union